James Clifford may refer to:

 James Clifford (musician) (1622–1698), English divine and musician
 James Clifford (artist) (1936–1987), Australian Modernist painter
 James Clifford (historian) (born 1945), historian and professor at the University of California, Santa Cruz
 James Clifford (MP), member of parliament for Gloucestershire
 James Clifford (designer), American fashion designer

See also